Sandlin is a surname. Notable people with the surname include:

Andrew Sandlin, Christian minister, cultural theologian, and author
David Sandlin (born 1956), Northern Irish-born American artist
Destin Sandlin (born 1981), American engineer and science communicator
Jack Sandlin, American politician
John N. Sandlin (1872–1957), American politician
Johnny Sandlin (1945–2017), American recording engineer and record producer
Lena Sandlin-Hedman (born 1969), Swedish politician
Max Sandlin (born 1952), American politician
Nick Sandlin (born 1997), American professional baseball pitcher
Rosemary Sandlin (born 1946), American politician
Stephanie Herseth Sandlin (born 1970), American attorney, university administrator, and politician
Tim Sandlin (born 1950), American novelist and screenwriter
Tommy Sandlin (1944–2006), Swedish ice hockey coach
Willie Sandlin (1890–1949), American World War I soldier